VST Industries Ltd. is a  public conglomerate company headquartered in Hyderabad,  India. The company manufactures and distributes cigarettes. Its Market Capitalization is 5604 Cr as on end june, 2021, PE Value: 17.94 and Dividend Yield: 3%.
The company has its registered office in Hyderabad. It started off as the formerly Vazir Sultan Tobacco Company, commonly known as VST and is an associate undertaking of British American Tobacco group of the United Kingdom, It is fully independent and registered as VST Industries Ltd in the year 1983 British American Tobacco (BAT), through its subsidiaries The Raleigh Investment Company Limited, Tobacco Manufacturers (India) Limited and Rothmans International Enterprises Ltd, hold 23.45, 8.28 & 0.43% shares totaling to 32.16%.

History
Vazir Sultan Tobacco was started by the late Mr. Vazir Sultan in 1916, present Vithalwadi, Hyderabad. VST went public in 1930. He died on 12 June 1923.

He was survived by 7 sons and 3 daughters. Eldest son Mr. Mohammad Sultan was the 1st chairman of VST Industries.

Brands

The company also operates under the names of Total, Charms, Charminar, Editions , Special, and Moments. Its headquarters are located in Hyderabad, India. It is the second largest cigarette manufacturing company in India. The company declared a dividend of 450% in 2011 making it one of the highest dividend yielding stocks in the Bombay Stock Exchange. The seventh and last Nizam of Hyderabad, Osman Ali Khan, Asaf Jah VII, used to smoke Charminar cigarettes, which were specially rolled for him in roasted tobacco.

References

[[VST contributes to the society, supports settig up of a city police hospital, 2021]]

Tobacco companies of India
Manufacturing companies based in Hyderabad, India
Indian companies established in 1930
Companies listed on the National Stock Exchange of India
Companies listed on the Bombay Stock Exchange